The 1914 Florida Gators football team represented the University of Florida during the 1914 Southern Intercollegiate Athletic Association football season. The season was C. J. McCoy's first year of three as the head coach of the Gators team.  McCoy's 1914 Florida Gators completed their ninth varsity football season on a four-game winning streak, with an overall record of 5–2  and an SIAA conference record of 3–2.

Before the season
End Joe Swanson was shifted to fullback.

Schedule

Season summary

Auburn

Sources:

Coach Mike Donahue's Auburn team was nearly as strong as the season before, and beat Florida 20–0  en route to another SIAA title. In contrast to last year, the Gators held Auburn scoreless in the first half, and the loss was seen as a moral victory and sign of progress.  However, the Gators also lost their captain. John Sutton left the game feeling poorly, and further examination revealed a weak heart. Roy "Puss" Hancock took over for Sutton as captain.

Auburn's backfield played well and  fullback Bedie Bidez scored two touchdowns. Florida gave way to Auburn's superior weight by the second half.

King College
In the second week of play, Florida enjoyed a first-time victory against the King College Tornado, 36–0.

Sewanee

Sources:

Florida suffered a shutout loss to the Sewanee Tigers, 26–0. Florida was outplayed in the first half. In the final period, Sewanee quarterback Lee Tolley had an 85-yard touchdown run.

The starting lineup was Henderson (left end), Lotspeich (left tackle), Goldsby (left guard), Farrior (center), Yon (right guard), Hancock (right tackle), Freeman (right end), Oates (quarterback), Fuller (left halfback), Sparkman (right halfback), Swanson (fullback).

Florida Southern

Wofford
Florida beat  for the first time, 66–0.

The Citadel

Sources:

In Charleston, the Gators defeated The Citadel 7–0 in a heavy rain and a field saturated with inches of mud.  Rammy Ramsdell returned the opening kickoff back 40 yards, and Jim Sparkman eventually carried it over for the decisive touchdown, "before the ball was wet."

Mercer
Florida closed the season with a 14–0 win over the Mercer Baptists on Thanksgiving.

Postseason
Florida ranked in the top half of the SIAA. The yearbook remarked that a Gator squad had never had more "guts".

Personnel

Linemen

Backfield

Coaching staff
Head coach: Charles J. McCoy
Manager: Ed Embry

References

Bibliography
 
 

Florida
Florida Gators football seasons
Florida Gators football